Walter Lawrence McCaffrey (January 28, 1949 – July 10, 2013) was an American politician from New York City.

Born in Queens, New York to Irish parents, he graduated from the Monsignor McClancy Memorial High School and attended Iona College. He served on the New York City Council as a Democrat from 1986 to 2001. He served as a lobbyist and consultant in his business, The McCaffrey Group.

McCaffrey died at age 64, two months after sustaining injuries in a car crash in Manhattan. On May 8, 2014, the corner of 61st Street and Woodside Avenue in Woodside, Queens, New York, was renamed "Walter McCaffery Place".

References 

1949 births
2013 deaths
People from Queens, New York
Iona University alumni
Businesspeople from Queens, New York
New York (state) Democrats
New York City Council members
American people of Irish descent
20th-century American businesspeople